Moonak is a town and a nagar panchayat in Sangrur district in the Indian state of Punjab. Moonak is situated near the Punjab-Haryana border. The nearest towns of Haryana are Jakhal Mandi and Tohana. The nearest commercial airport to Moonak is at Chandigarh which is 150 km from here. The majority of people are engaged in farming and agricultural activities.

Demographics
The Moonak has population of 18,141 of which 9,475 are males while 8,666 are females as per report released by Census India 2011. The population of Children with age of 0-6 is 2325 which is 12.82% of total population of Moonak. In Moonak, Female Sex Ratio is of 915 against state average of 895. Moreover, child sex ratio in Moonak is around 863 compared to Punjab state average of 846. The literacy rate of the town is 67.68%, which is lower than state average of 75.84%. While male literacy is around 73.54% and female literacy rate is 61.33%.

History

Moonak was originally known as Akalgarh. There is an old fort 'Qila Mubarik' said to have been built in the Muslim period. In the fort, there was a well with unhealthy water. Hardened prisoners of Patiala State were sent to this place where they died after a few days. The town is a Tehsil of the Sangrur district. It is surrounded by Ghaggar, a seasonal river which causes floods during monsoon. In 1988, 1992, 2011, 2015 and 2019, floods led to loss of crops, death and destruction in and around the areas. People are demanding its deepening.

Climate
Moonak has similar climate like other places in North India. It has profile of semi-arid climate. During the months of June and July, the temperature rises to 44 °C. In December and January, the temperature falls to around 10 °C. In monsoons, Moonak receives average rainfall.

Major business activities
Most of the population depends on agriculture and farming. There are also some small-scale industries:
 Incense manufacturing
 Sushil Dhoop Industries
 Agriculture machine manufacturing
 Wine and whiskey making
 PVC pipe manufacturing
 Fertilizer factory
 Rice mills
 Brick making
 Furniture manufacturing

Notable people
Gurbachan Singh Talib - author- Conferred with Padma Bhushan in 1985
Brish Bhan - advocate- Last Chief Minister PEPSU in 1955

Nearby towns
 Pattran
 Khanauri
 Sunam
 Lehragaga
 Jakhal Mandi
  Makror Sahib 
 Tohana

References

Cities and towns in Sangrur district